Admiral Sir Thomas Dawson Lees Sheppard, KBE, CB, MVO (7 April 1866 – 24 February 1953) was a Royal Navy officer.

References 

1866 births
1953 deaths
Knights Commander of the Order of the British Empire
Companions of the Order of the Bath
Members of the Royal Victorian Order
Royal Navy admirals
Royal Navy admirals of World War I